Chetone zuleika is a moth of the family Erebidae first described by Vitor Osmar Becker and David T. Goodger in 2013. It is found in Panama, Colombia and Brazil.

Adults mimic the butterflies Heliconius hecale zuleika, Tithorea tarricina pinthias, Eueides procula vulgiformis and Papilio ascolius zalates.

References

Moths described in 2013
Chetone